In complex analysis the Stokes phenomenon, discovered by , is that the asymptotic behavior of functions can differ in different regions of the complex plane, and that these differences can be described in a quantitative way. These regions are bounded by what are called Stokes lines or anti-Stokes lines.

Stokes lines and anti-Stokes lines

Somewhat confusingly, mathematicians and physicists use the terms "Stokes line" and "anti-Stokes line" in opposite ways. The lines originally studied by Stokes are what some mathematicians call anti-Stokes lines and what physicists call Stokes lines. (These terms are also used in optics for the unrelated Stokes lines and anti-Stokes lines in Raman scattering). This article uses the physicist's convention, which is historically more accurate and seems to be becoming more common among mathematicians.  recommends the term "principal curve" for (physicist's) anti-Stokes lines.

Informally the anti-Stokes lines are roughly where some term in the asymptotic expansion changes from increasing to decreasing (and therefore can exhibit a purely oscillatory behavior), and the Stokes lines are lines along which some term approaches infinity or zero fastest. Anti-Stokes lines bound regions where the function exhibit a particular asymptotic behavior. The Stokes lines and anti-Stokes lines are not unique and do not really have a precise definition in general, because the region where a function has a given asymptotic behavior is a somewhat vague concept. However the lines do usually have well determined directions at essential singularities of the function, and there is sometimes a natural choice of these lines as follows.  The asymptotic expansion of a function is often given by a linear combination of functions of the form f(z)e±g(z) for functions f and g. The Stokes lines can then be taken as the zeros of the imaginary part of g, and the anti-Stokes lines as the zeros of the real part of g. (This is not quite canonical, because one can add a constant to g, changing the lines.) If the lines are defined like this then they are orthogonal where they meet, unless g has a multiple zero.

As a trivial example, the function sinh(z) has two regions Re(z) > 0 and Re(z) < 0 where it is asymptotic to ez/2 and −e−z/2. So the anti-Stokes line can be taken to be the imaginary axis, and the Stokes line can be taken to be the real axis. One could equally well take the Stokes line to be any line of given imaginary part; these choices differ only by a vertical shift, showing that there is no canonical choice for the Stokes line.

Example: the Airy function

The Airy function Ai(x) is one of two solutions to a simple differential equation

which it is often useful to approximate for many values of x – including complex values. For large x of given argument the solution can be approximated by a linear combination of the functions

However, the linear combination has to change as the argument of x passes certain values (when x crosses a branch cut) because these approximations contain multi-valued functions. In contrast, the Airy function is single valued and indeed entire and therefore, in order to make sense of the approximation, one has to choose a single value out of the multiple possible values (this imposes a branch cut for the approximation, by implication).
For example, if we regard the limit of x as large and real, and would like to approximate the Airy function for both positive and negative values, we would find that

 

which are two very different expressions. The coefficient of  can jump at this line but is not forced to; it can change gradually as arg x varies from π/3 to π because it is not determined in this region.

There are three anti-Stokes lines with arguments π/3, π. –π/3, and three Stokes lines with arguments  2π/3, 0. –2π/3.

Example: second order linear differential equations

The Airy function example can be generalized to a broad class of second order linear differential equations as follows. By standard changes of variables, a second order equation can often be changed to one of the form

where f is holomorphic in a simply-connected region and w is a solution of the differential equation. Then in some cases the WKB method gives an asymptotic approximation for w as a linear combination of functions of the form

 

for some constant a. (Choosing different values of a is equivalent to choosing different coefficients in the linear combination.) The anti-Stokes lines and Stokes lines are then the zeros of the real and imaginary parts, respectively, of

 

If a is a simple zero of f then locally f looks like . Solutions will locally behave like the Airy functions; they will have three Stokes lines and three anti-Stokes lines meeting at a.

See also

 Borel summation

References

 

 

Ablowitz, M. J., & Fokas, A. S. (2003). Complex variables: introduction and applications. Cambridge University Press.

Asymptotic analysis
Complex analysis